Silke Bodenbender (born 31 January 1974 in Bonn) is a German actress.

Selected filmography

References

External links
 

1974 births
Living people
German television actresses
Actors from Bonn